Jorden runt på 6 steg, "Around the World in 6 Steps", is a Swedish infotainment television series starring Filip Hammar and Fredrik Wikingsson, produced by Nexiko Media and aired in Kanal 5 in 2015. The first season consisted of three 80-minute episodes and was aired in 2015. Filip and Fredrik have recorded a second season which started airing November 2016, and desire to export the format.

The format tests the six degrees of separation hypothesis. In each episode, Filip and Fredrik travel to a distant country, find a random person, and try to trace that person's relationships to a given celebrity (such as crime writer Leif G. W. Persson, chef Gordon Ramsay, and astronaut Buzz Aldrin) within one week. Throughout the first season, they visit all continents except Antarctica, travelling a distance equivalent to three trips around the world.

Season 1

Season 2

References

Kanal 5 (Swedish TV channel) original programming
Swedish reality television series